The 1997 Berserk anime series is based on the manga series of the same name by Kentaro Miura. The episodes are directed by Naohito Takahashi and animated by Oriental Light and Magic. The first thirteen volumes of the manga are covered. The series' twenty-five episodes aired between October 8, 1997 and April 1, 1998 in Japan on Nippon TV.

The series focuses on the life of Guts, an orphaned mercenary warrior who calls himself "The Black Swordsman", as he looks upon his days serving as a member of a group of mercenaries, the Band of the Hawk. Led by an ambitious, ruthless, yet intelligent and graceful man named Griffith, together they battle their way into the royal court, and are forced into a fate that may change their entire lives. Each episode uses two pieces of theme music, one opening theme and one ending theme. The opening theme is "Tell Me Why" by Penpals. The ending theme is "Waiting So Long" by Silver Fins.

Episode list

See also
 List of Berserk (2016) episodes
 List of Berserk chapters

Notes

References

Berserk (manga)
Berserk (1997)

ca:Llista de capítols del manga Berserk